Lutana is a residential locality in the local government area (LGA) of Glenorchy in the Hobart LGA region of Tasmania. The 2016 census recorded a population of 2353 for the state suburb of Lutana.
It is a suburb of Hobart.

It is a large residential suburb located between the Brooker Highway and the River Derwent.

History 
Lutana was gazetted as a locality in 1961.

It was originally built by Electrolytic Zinc (the operator of the Risdon Zinc Works) as homes for its employees at the nearby zinc works.

Lutana means "moon" in one of the Aboriginal Tasmanian languages.

The homes were later sold off and are now privately owned.

Geography
The waters of the River Derwent and New Town Bay form the north-eastern to south-eastern boundaries.

Road infrastructure 
National Route 1 (Brooker Highway) passes to the south-west, and several roads provide access to the locality.

References

Towns in Tasmania
Localities of City of Glenorchy